Prionessus is a genus of extinct mammal from the Paleocene of Central Asia. It was a member of the extinct order Multituberculata within the suborder Cimolodonta and superfamily Taeniolabidoidea. The genus was named by Matthew W.D. and Granger W. in 1925 and is based on a single species.

The species Prionessus lucifer was named by Matthew W.D. and Granger W. in 1925. Fossil remains have been found in the Late Paleocene Nomogen and Khashat Formations of Gashato, Naran and Nomogen in Bayan Ulan of Mongolia and China.

References

Further reading 
 Matthew and Granger (1925), "Fauna and Correlation of the Gashato Formation of Mongolia". Am. Museum Novitates 189, p. 1-12.
 Kielan-Jaworowska Z. and Hurum J.H. (2001), "Phylogeny and Systematics of Multituberculate Mammals". Paleontology 44, p. 389-429.
 Much of this information has been derived from  MESOZOIC MAMMALS: Eucosmodontidae, Microcosmodontidae and Taeniolabidoidea, an Internet directory

Cimolodonts
Paleocene mammals
Paleocene genus extinctions
Paleogene mammals of Asia
Prehistoric mammal genera